Abraham Kohen Kaplan (25 July 1839 – 2 February 1897) was a Russian Hebrew writer, poet, and translator.

Biography
Abraham Kaplan was born into a Jewish family in the town of Wilke, Kovno Governorate. Having acquired a reputation as a good Hebrew writer at home, he moved to Vienna, where he followed the profession of a publicist until his death.

Kaplan frequently contributed to the Hebrew periodicals, and was involved in press polemics on the merit of the works of Smolenskin, which he defended against their critics. Kaplan's defense provoked the publication of the pamphlet Kohen lelo-Elohim (Warsaw, 1878), in which Kaplan was violently attacked.

Selected publications

References
 

1839 births
1897 deaths
Biographers from the Russian Empire
Hebrew-language poets
Jewish poets
Jewish translators
Jewish writers from the Russian Empire
Jews from the Russian Empire
Male writers from the Russian Empire
People from Kovno Governorate
Poets from the Russian Empire
Translators from German
Translators from the Russian Empire
Translators to Hebrew
People of the Haskalah